Ghazipur Sadar is a constituency of the Uttar Pradesh Legislative Assembly covering the city of Ghazipur Sadar in the Ghazipur district of Uttar Pradesh, India.

Ghazipur Sadar is one of five assembly constituencies in the Ghazipur Lok Sabha constituency. Since 2008, this assembly constituency is numbered 375 amongst 403 constituencies.

Election results

2022

2017
Bharatiya Janta Party candidate Sangeeta Balwant won in 2017 Uttar Pradesh Legislative Elections defeating Samajwadi Party candidate Rajesh Kushwaha by a margin of 32,607 votes.

Members of Legislative Assembly

 1957: Pabbar Ram, Communist Party of India
 1962: Krishnanand Rai, Indian National Congress
 1967: Pabbar Ram, Communist Party of India 
 1969: Ram Surat Singh, Indian National Congress
 1974: Shah Abdul Faiz, Bahujan Kranti Dal
 1977: Mohd. Khalilullan Kuraishi, Janata Party
 1980: Ram Narain, Janata Party (Secular) - Charan Singh
 1985: Amitabh Anil Dubey, Indian National Congress
 1989: Khursheed, Independent 
 1991: Udai Pratap, Bharatiya Janata Party
 1996: Rajendra, Communist Party of India
 2002: Umashanker, Bahujan Samaj Party
 2007: Saiyyada Shadab Fatima, Samajwadi Party
 2012: Vijay Kumar Mishra, Samajwadi Party
 2017: Sangeeta Balwant, Bharatiya Janata Party

See also
 Ghazipur
 Ghazipur district
 List of constituencies of Uttar Pradesh Legislative Assembly

References

External links
 

Assembly constituencies of Uttar Pradesh
Ghazipur
Politics of Ghazipur district